Nikhil Siddhartha (born 1 June 1985) is an Indian actor of the Telugu film industry. He played minor roles in various films before being cast in Happy Days (2007) as one of the four male leads. The film was successful and became his breakthrough role. He later went onto play the lead in noted films such as Yuvatha (2008), Swamy Ra Ra (2013), Karthikeya (2014), Surya vs Surya (2015), Ekkadiki Pothavu Chinnavada (2016), Kesava (2017), Arjun Suravaram (2019), Karthikeya 2 (2022) and 18 Pages (2022).

Early life
Nikhil Siddhartha was born in Begumpet, a neighbourhood of Hyderabad of present-day Telangana, India. His father Kavali Shyam Siddhartha hails from Mahbubnagar in Telangana. After his schooling from Hyderabad Public School, he graduated from Muffakham Jah College of Engineering and Technology. His father suffered from a rare disease, corticobasal degeneration, for eight years before passing away on 28 April 2022.

Career
Nikhil started out as an assistant director for the film Hyderabad Nawabs (2006). He played minor roles in various films before being cast in Happy Days (2007). Directed by Sekhar Kammula, Nikhil played one of the four leads in the film. He was paid a remuneration of 25,000 for his role in the film and he still keeps the check with him. Happy Days was one among the few low budget films made in 2007 that became one of the most successful movies in that year.

His first film as a solo lead was Ankit, Pallavi & Friends (2008). He next appeared in films like Yuvatha (2008), Kalavar King (2010), Aalasyam Amrutham (2010), and Veedu Theda (2011). 

His 2013 film Swamy Ra Ra became a commercial success and marked a new phase in his career where he started picking distinct scripts rather than run-of-the-mill commercial films. His next film, titled Karthikeya (2014) was a critical and commercial success.

In 2017, Nikhil once again teamed up with Swamy Ra Ra Director Sudheer Varma for Keshava which is a revenge drama where Nikhil plays a character with a rare congenital disorder Dextrocardia, who wants to avenge the death of his family. The film released on 19 May 2017 and received positive reviews for Nikhil's performance, musical score, visuals, and backdrop of the plot.

His next film Kirrak Party (2018), a remake of Kannada Kirik Party (2016) opposite Samyuktha Hegde and Simran Pareenja, was a college campus film directed by Sharan Koppisetty. The film underperformed at the box office. The film's screenplay was written by Sudheer Varma and dialogues were penned by Chandoo Mondeti. His next film Arjun Suravaram released in 2019 and was successful. With the 2022 film Karthikeya 2, Nikhil entered the 100 Crore Club.

Personal life 
Nikhil married Pallavi Varma on 14 May 2020.

Filmography

All films are in Telugu, unless otherwise noted.

References

External links
 

Indian male film actors
Living people
1985 births
Telugu male actors
Male actors in Telugu cinema
Male actors from Hyderabad, India
21st-century Indian male actors